The list of shipwrecks in February 1874 includes ships sunk, foundered, grounded, or otherwise lost during February 1874.

1 February

2 February

4 February

5 February

6 February

7 February

8 February

9 February

10 February

11 February

12 February

13 February

14 February

15 February

16 February

17 February

18 February

20 February

21 February

23 February

24 February

25 February

26 February

27 February

28 February

Unknown date

{{shipwreck list item
|ship=Vites
|flag=
|desc=The barque was abandoned at sea. Her ten crew were rescued by the barque San Miguel. Vites was on a voyage from Galway to Cardiff.
}}

References

Bibliography
Ingram, C. W. N., and Wheatley, P. O., (1936) Shipwrecks: New Zealand disasters 1795–1936.'' Dunedin, NZ: Dunedin Book Publishing Association.

1874-02
Maritime incidents in February 1874